German-occupied Europe refers to the sovereign countries of Europe which were wholly or partly occupied and civil-occupied (including puppet governments) by the military forces and the government of Nazi Germany at various times between 1939 and 1945, during and shortly before World War II, generally administered by the Nazi regime, under the dictatorship of Adolf Hitler. The German Wehrmacht occupied European territory:

 as far east as the town of Mozdok in the North Caucasus in the Soviet Union (1942–1943)
 as far north as the settlement of Barentsburg in Svalbard in the Kingdom of Norway
 as far south as the island of Gavdos in the Kingdom of Greece
 as far west as the island of Ushant in the French Republic

In 1941, around 280 million people in Europe, more than half the population, were governed by the Nazis or their allies and puppet states.

Background
Several German-occupied countries initially entered World War II as Allies of the United Kingdom or the Soviet Union. Some were forced to surrender before the outbreak of the war such as Czechoslovakia; others like Poland (invaded on 1 September 1939) were conquered in battle and then occupied. In some cases, the legitimate governments went into exile, in other cases the governments-in-exile were formed by their citizens in other Allied countries. Some countries occupied by Nazi Germany were officially neutral. Others were former members of the Axis powers that were subsequently occupied by German forces.

Occupied countries 
The countries occupied included all, or most of the following:

Governments in exile

Allied governments in exile

Axis governments in exile

Neutral governments in exile

See also 
Areas annexed by Germany
Underground media in German-occupied Europe
Drang nach Osten ("The Drive Eastward")
Greater Germanic Reich
Lebensraum ("Living Space")
Neuordnung ("New Order")
Pan-Germanism
Russian-occupied territories

References

Bibliography
 Bank, Jan. Churches and Religion in the Second World War (Occupation in Europe) (2016)
 Gildea, Robert and Olivier Wieviorka. Surviving Hitler and Mussolini: Daily Life in Occupied Europe (2007).
 Klemann, Hein A.M. and Sergei Kudryashov, eds. Occupied Economies: An Economic History of Nazi-Occupied Europe, 1939–1945 (2011).
 Lagrou, Pieter. The Legacy of Nazi Occupation: Patriotic Memory and National Recovery in Western Europe, 1945–1965 (1999)

 Scheck, Raffael; Fabien Théofilakis; and Julia S. Torrie, eds. German-occupied Europe in the Second World War (Routledge, 2019). 276 pp. online review
 Snyder, Timothy. Bloodlands: Europe Between Hitler and Stalin (2010), on Eastern Europe
 Toynbee, Arnold, ed. Survey of International Affairs, 1939–1946: Hitler's Europe (Oxford University Press.  1954) 730pp.  online review;  full text online free

Primary sources
 Carlyle Margaret, ed. Documents on International Affairs, 1939–1946. Volume II, Hitler's Europe (Oxford University Press.  1954) 362pp.)

External links
 Map of Europe in 1942
 Allies
 BBC - History - Germany advances through Europe (pictures, video, facts & news)
 

World War II occupied territories
Europe
Axis powers
Nazi Germany